Angraecum sanfordii is a species of plant in the family Orchidaceae. It is endemic to Cameroon, where it occurs on Mount Kupe and Mount Cameroon. It grows in submontane and montane habitat types. It is an epiphyte. It is threatened by habitat loss.

References 

sanfordii
Endemic orchids of Cameroon
Endangered plants
Taxonomy articles created by Polbot